Sigeberht (meaning roughly "Magnificent Victory") was the King of Wessex from 756 to 757.

Sigeberht succeeded his distant relative Cuthred, but was then accused of acting unjustly. After ruling a year he was accused of unlawful acts and removed from power by the witan, a council of nobles. This council was led by Cynewulf who succeeded Sigeberht. The former Sigeberht was given control of Hampshire. There, he was accused of murder, driven out and ultimately killed. It is possible that this happened under the influence of Æthelbald of Mercia. His brother Cyneheard was also driven out, but returned in 786 to kill Sigeberht's successor Cynewulf.

See also
House of Wessex family tree

References

External links 

West Saxon monarchs
Year of birth unknown
757 deaths
8th-century English monarchs
House of Wessex